Lawrence Hazard (May 12, 1897 – April 1, 1959) was an American playwright and screenwriter active between 1933 and 1958. His career was cut short when he died at age 61 in 1959. His films include Man's Castle (1933) directed by Frank Borzage and starring Spencer Tracy and Loretta Young; Mannequin (1937) directed by Borzage and starring Joan Crawford and Spencer Tracy; Strange Cargo (1940) directed by Borzage and starring Clark Gable and Joan Crawford; The Spoilers (1942) starring Marlene Dietrich and John Wayne; Jackass Mail (1942) starring Wallace Beery; Dakota (1945) starring John Wayne and Walter Brennan, and numerous other films as well as scripts for television anthologies in the 1950s.

Partial filmography
 Man's Castle (1933)
 I'll Love You Always (1935)
 Hooray for Love (1935)
 Mannequin (1937)
 Strange Cargo (1940)
 The Spoilers (1942)
 Jackass Mail (1942)
 Whistling in Dixie (1942)
 Dakota (1945)
 Wyoming (1947)
 The Fabulous Texan (1947)

External links
 

1897 births
1959 deaths
20th-century American dramatists and playwrights
American male screenwriters
American male dramatists and playwrights
20th-century American male writers
20th-century American screenwriters